Ricky Betar (born 25 September 2003)  is an Australian Paralympic swimmer with an intellectual disability. He competed at the 2020 Summer Paralympics in Tokyo, Japan.

Personal
He was born 25 September 2003 in Osaka, Japan. His father is Australian and mother is Japanese. He attended Moorebank High School.

Swimming career
At the 2020 Summer Paralympics, Storm teamed up with Madeleine McTernan, Ricky Betar and Benjamin Hance in the Mixed 4 x 100 m freestyle S14.[5] They won the silver medal with a time of 3:46.38, just under 6 seconds behind the winners, Great Britain, who set a world record.[6] Betar  has been swimming since he was 10 years old. He is classified as a S14 swimmer. At the 2019 Australian Championships, he took home five medals at the national champs and broke an INAS world record for the 50m freestyle. His time of 1:02.03 in the 100m backstroke resulted in him on making his maiden Australian team for the 2019 World Para Swimming Championships. At the  2019 World Para Swimming Championships, London, he was a member of the Australian team that won the bronze medal in the Mixed 4 × 100 m Freestyle Relay S14. He also competed in the Men's 200m Freestyle S14, Men's 100m Backstroke S14, Men's 100m Butterfly S14 and Men's 100m Butterfly S14.

At the 2020 Tokyo Paralympics, Betar teamed up with Madeleine McTernan, Ruby Storm, and Benjamin Hance in the Mixed 4 x 100 m freestyle S14. They won the silver medal with a time of 3:46.38, just under 6 seconds behind the winners, Great Britain, who set a world record. Betar also qualified for the finals in the 200 m freestyle S14 and 100 m butterfly S14 and finished seventh and eighth respectively. He also competed in the 100 m backstroke S14 but failed to advance to the Final.

In 2019, he was awarded the Kurt Fearnley Scholarship.

References

External links
 
 
 

2003 births
Living people
Intellectual Disability category Paralympic competitors
Male Paralympic swimmers of Australia
S14-classified Paralympic swimmers
Sportspeople with intellectual disability
Medalists at the World Para Swimming Championships
Paralympic silver medalists for Australia
Paralympic medalists in swimming
Swimmers at the 2020 Summer Paralympics
Australian male freestyle swimmers
Australian male butterfly swimmers
Australian male backstroke swimmers
21st-century Australian people